Chelluru is a village in Rayavaram Mandal in Konaseema district of Andhra Pradesh, India.

References

Villages in East Godavari district